Sahand is a  in the Southern Fleet of the Islamic Republic of Iran Navy, named in memory of the sunk frigate bearing the same name of the Sahand volcano.

Description
Sahand has been equipped with a locally-manufactured point-defense weapon system dubbed "Kamand." Sahand is armed with cruise anti-ship missiles and has a helicopter deck and electronic warfare systems.

Sahand is equipped with an anti-submarine system and a stealth system, and enjoys higher maneuverability and increased operational range. The ship has four powerful engines, an improvement on Jamaran.

Sahand is capable of sailing on turbulent waters and distant oceans for 150 days while accompanied by a support vessel.

Irani also said that Nawab, a domestically-developed medium-range surface-to-air missile system, has already been installed on the Sahand destroyer. Point-defense weapon systems for detecting and destroying incoming missiles and enemy aircraft and anti-missile systems have also been used in the indigenous destroyer. He also added that efforts are underway to install Abu Mahdi naval cruise missile on Iranian military watercraft, noting that the country’s destroyers would be equipped with more powerful cruise missiles. He explained that the Iranian Navy’s surface-to-surface cruise missile power has doubled and that the country’s destroyers will be deployed to high sea for the first time with 8 cruise missiles mounted on them.

History
Sahand was unveiled to the public in late November 2012.  All that was shown was pictures of the completed hull and superstructure.  The ship was not outfitted with weapons, electronics, or other essential military equipment. These systems were due to be installed in one or two years. The ship entered service on 1 December 2018. Sahand is named in the memory of the original Sahand that was sunk by the U.S. in Operation Praying Mantis during the Iran–Iraq War on 18 April 1988.

In June 2021, Sahand, accompanied by IRINS Makran (a naval-converted oil tanker), were the first Iranian naval ships to reach the Atlantic without docking in an international port, according to official Iranian sources. Early media report incorrectly suggested they were bound for Venezuela, but the ships were bound for Saint Petersburg to attend Navy Day to commemorate the 325th anniversary of the Russian Navy foundation. Makran was reported to be carrying several Fast Attack Craft.

See also

 List of current ships of the Islamic Republic of Iran Navy

References

External link

Ships built at Iranian Naval Factories
2012 ships
Moudge-class frigates